General elections were held in Liberia in 1895. In the presidential election, incumbent Joseph James Cheeseman of the True Whig Party (the sole legal party) was re-elected for a third term.

References

Liberia
1895 in Liberia
Elections in Liberia
One-party elections
Election and referendum articles with incomplete results